Samla telja is a species of sea slug, an aeolid nudibranch, a marine heterobranch mollusc in the family Samlidae.

Distribution
This species occurs from the Gulf of California and the Pacific coast of Mexico to Panama.

Description
Samla telja is a flabellinid nudibranch with a translucent white body with a strong rose-pink hue. It has opaque white spots over the surfaces of the cerata and the back of the body and the sides of the foot.

The description of Orienthella fogata includes a table comparing similar species from Mexico.

References

External links
 

Samlidae
Gastropods described in 1967